State of Conviction formed in 1996 and is an American hardcore punk band with a funk background. The band was spawned from the Unified Culture song "Convictions".

State of Conviction released a split 7-inch vinyl with Schnauzer in November 1996. SOC's side was entitled "Thoughts Light Fires" (a tribute to Charles Manson).

The band then released its album, A Call To Arms in 1997. The album has samples from the movies Natural Born Killers and Taxi Driver, as well as samples from Charles Manson. Two tracks from the album, "Convictions" and "Abandoned", were originally Unified Culture songs. Dwid, from Integrity, does guest vocals on the tracks "Convictions", "Brink of Extinction", and "Faith Diminished".

State of Conviction has a history of only playing once or twice a year, and a great majority of those shows were at the Phantasy or Agora Ballroom in Cleveland, Ohio, United States.  It also has a history of playing shows with the band Schnauzer.  SOC played its most recent show on November 23, 2012, at Peabody's Concert Club. At that show, Tom Shaffner and Eric Matthews sat out while Josh Endres of Silver Skull took Tom's spot on guitar and Justin Endres, also of Silver Skull, took Eric's spot on the drums for the song, "In God We Rust." However, this was not the first time that Justin has been seen sitting in on the drums for SOC, he also made a guest appearance on drums with the band in April 2012.

References
 

Hardcore punk groups from Ohio
Musical groups from Cleveland